The four-lined wrasse, Pseudocheilinus tetrataenia, is a species of wrasse native to the Pacific Ocean. It can be found in the aquarium trade.

References

External links
 

foyur-lined wrasse
Fish described in 1960